The Fisher-Girl and the Crab is an Indian fairy tale collected by Verrier Elwin in Folk-Tales of Mahakoshal; it comes from the Kurukh, a people living in Chitrakoot, Bastar State.

Synopsis

A Kurukh couple had no children.  They found a gourd by their rice field and started to eat it, but it begged them to cut gently.  They found a crab inside it.  The woman tied a basket to her belly, pretended to be pregnant, and then pretended to have given birth to the crab.  In time, they married him off, but the girl did not like being married to a crab.  She sneaked off when the parents and crab were asleep, but the crab sneaked ahead of her.  He asked a banyan tree whose it was; it said it was his; he ordered it to fall down.  He took out a human shape from inside it and put it on, putting his crab shape in the tree.  The girl met him at a dance and gave him her ornaments.  He went back before her and took on his crab shape again, and gave her her ornaments, which frightened her.  She went to sneak out again but watched the crab.  When he had put on the human shape, she asked the trees whose it was; it said it was hers; she ordered it to fall down and burned the crab shape.  When her husband could not find her at the dance, he came back, and she jumped out, caught him, and took him home.

Analysis

Motifs 
Elwin noted that the crab is considered monogamous and an example of domestic fidelity.

The tale contains the motif B647.1.1., "Marriage to person in crab form".

Variants 
Professor Stuart Blackburn locates variants with the crab husband among tribal groups from India (namely, the Gondi, the Kuruk, and Santal), as well as from Burma (Shan), and
northern Laos (Mien).

Elwin collected a tale from the Muria people from Markabera with the title The Crab-Prince. In this tale, a Muria couple live alone and plant rice near the bank of a river, when a crab called Kakramal Kuar comes out of the river to eat their rice. The woman asks her husband to prepare a jitka trap for the crab. The Muria man catches the crab and is poised to kill it with an axe, when the crab asks the man to take it home, to which he agrees. Eight days later, the local Rajá is summoning all the young people, men and women, to work in harvesting the fields. The crab decides to join them, despite the Muria woman's objections. However, the crab is expelled by other workers and finds another spot in the Raja's daughter's fields, where he takes off the shell and becomes a "beautiful twelve-year-old-boy". Meanwhile, the Raja's daughter brings some gruel to feed the harvesters, and learns of the crab working on her fields. She goes there and sees the boy, who quickly hides back into his crustacean shell. The princess places his food between his claws, and joins the others. Later that same day, the crab joins with the remaining workers for a meal with pork and liquor. Some time later, the princess is sulking, and asks her father for her to be married as soon as possible. The Rajah summons princes from all locations for a suitor selection, but the princess chooses none. When the crab comes to the assemblage, the princess places a garland on him and marries him. One night, the crab boy takes off the shell and goes to the stables to mount on his father-in-law's horses and ride them to exhaustion. The horses' condition begins to arouse suspicions in the monarch, who decides to investigate: he spies on his son-in-law coming out of his shell and riding the horses. The Raja then tells his daughter to burn the crab shell the next time he takes it off. The princess does it and the boy remains human for good, although at first he did not want to be seen without his shell.

Author Shovona Devi published a Bengali tale titled The Crab Prince. In this tale, a poor widow earns her living by begging for alms. One day, she reaches an empty hut in the forest where a vermilion-coloured crab lives. The crab treats the widow as his mother, and promises to bring her food. The next day, the crab goes to the food shops and crams the food in his ear to bring to the widow. Next time, he brings her money for her to build a better house for her. The third time, the widow cries that, if the crab was human, he could bring her a daughter-in-law. The crab promises to marry none other than the prince's daughter, and decides to go to the castle. On the journey, he is joined by a cat, a tiger, bamboos, and a river, which each enters the crab's ear. The crab goes to the prince's palace and demands to be married to his daughter. The prince thinks it an affront and tries to kill the crab many times, but each time his friends (the cat, the tiger, the bamboos and the river) stop the prince's attack. The prince surrenders and allows his daughter to marry the crab. Some time later, the prince visits his daughter in the widow's new house and learns that his son-in-law becomes human by night and remains a crab by day. The prince then advises his daughter to get rid of the crab shell. The next time the now human crab is asleep, the princess pounds his shell to dust and he stays human permanently.

See also
Animal as Bridegroom
The Donkey
The Goat Girl
The Golden Crab
Prince Crawfish
The Pig King

References

Fisher-Girl and the Crab
Fisher-Girl and the Crab
Fisher-Girl and the Crab
Fisher-Girl and the Crab
Fisher-Girl and the Crab
Female characters in fairy tales
Indian folklore
Indian literature
Fisher-Girl and the Crab